Meerpet–Jillelguda is a satellite city of Hyderabad and a municipal corporation in Rangareddy district of the Indian state of Telangana. The municipal corporation was formed after merging municipality of Meerpet and Jillelguda.

Etymology
Meerpet got its name due to the presence of Mir Momin masjid constructed by Mir Moomin Asterbadi – the prime minister of Muhammad Quli Qutb Shah the Fifth king of Qutb Shahi dynasty.

Demographics 
 India census, Meerpet had a population of 12,940. Males constitute 51% of the population and females 49%. Meerpet has an average literacy rate of 63%, higher than the national average of 59.5%: male literacy is 71%, and female literacy is 54%. In Meerpet, 12% of the population is under 6 years of age.

As per 2011 census, Meerpet–Jillelaguda has a population of 66,982. It had a male and female population of 34,009 and 32,973 receptively. Total number of households were about 18,000.

Administration 
Meerpet municipality and Jillelguda municipality were formed separately on 11 April 2016 by upgrading respective gram panchayats . Earlier Meerpet Gram panchayat was part of Jillelguda Gram panchayat which was administratively separated later

Both municipalities were merged into a single municipal corporation in 2019.

Transport 
Meerpet–Jillelaguda is connected to other places within Hyderabad via the TSRTC, with buses available from the DSNR and Midani bus depots. The nearest MMTS station is at Malakpet.The nearest airport is Hyderabad's Rajiv Gandhi International Airport. The nearest Metro station is at LB Nagar.

Landmarks 
A 500-year-old Venkateswara temple, known as Matsya Avatara Kalyana Venkateswara Swamy Temple has its presence in this town.

Hospitals & Clinics 
Sri Health Plus Children's & Family Clinic, R.N.Reddy Nagar, Meerpet.

References 

Neighbourhoods in Hyderabad, India
Cities and towns in Ranga Reddy district